Diaphus garmani, the Garman's lanternfish, is a species of lanternfish 
found worldwide.

Size

Etymology
The fish is named in honor of Harvard ichthyologist-herpetologist Samuel Garman (1843–1927).

References

Myctophidae
Taxa named by Charles Henry Gilbert
Fish described in 1906